Justice League Dark, or JLD, is a superhero team appearing in American comic books published by DC Comics. The team would make their debut appearance in Justice League Dark #1 (September 2011). The Justice League Dark team features some of the more supernatural characters in the DC Universe, handling mystical threats and situations deamed outside the scope of the traditional Justice League. Similarly to the Justice League title, the team features well-known characters such as John Constantine, Zatanna, Batman, Doctor Fate, and Wonder Woman while also bringing exposure to lesser-known supernatural characters. 

Justice League Dark has been adapted several times, appearing in both the animated movies Justice League Dark and Justice League Dark: Apokolips War.

Publication history
Justice League Dark was announced on May 31, 2011, as a First Wave title of The New 52. The title and team was created by Peter Milligan, with art by Mikel Janín. The title launched on September 28, 2011. The title brought several of DC Comics' occult and offbeat characters, something which had been a trait of sister imprint Vertigo, back into the main DC Universe following Vertigo's editorial change to publish purely new, creator-owned content.

The Search for Swamp Thing, a three part miniseries released between June and August 2011 which led up to The New 52 relaunch, and followed the events of the Brightest Day maxiseries, follows Constantine's search for the resurrected Alec Holland as the new Swamp Thing, involving the cooperation of Batman, Zatanna and Superman. In addition, the Flashpoint: Secret Seven miniseries, written by Milligan as part of the "Flashpoint" crossover story line, included the Enchantress and Shade, the Changing Man and introduced the character Mindwarp in the lead-up to the start of the series.

Peter Milligan stated in an interview that he got the job for the book from his work on the 2011 Flashpoint: Secret Seven miniseries, and that he hoped to write something "emotionally dark" set in the DC Universe, comparing his characters to detectives, who struggle to cope with the things they see and have to do. The initial anticipation for this title has been good, with critics celebrating the fact that DC are willing to bring back some of the darker elements which had moved over to Vertigo in the 1990s.

The opening story line involves the Enchantress' defeat of the Justice League, leading to the necessity of a more supernatural team to assist in these events, and detailing how they have come together. There is also a minor crossover story with I...Vampire. From issue #9, Sweet Tooth and Animal Man writer Jeff Lemire became the principal writer on the series. In his first story arc, Justice League Dark took residence in their new base, at the House of Mystery, and have started to show their links with the wider DC Universe, dealing with Steve Trevor and A.R.G.U.S.

In August 2013, it was announced that J. M. DeMatteis would take over as series writer from Lemire in November 2013, after a solo issue by Ray Fawkes in October. The series ended publication in March 2015.

In March 2018, a new volume of Justice League Dark was announced. Spinning out of the "Justice League: No Justice" story line, the title debuted in July 2018, written by James Tynion IV and drawn by Alvaro Martinez, Raul Fernandez and Brad Anderson. The team features Zatanna, the Swamp Thing, the Man-Bat, and Detective Chimp, and is led by Wonder Woman. Additional magical characters from the DC Universe appeared in the series, like John Constantine and Doctor Fate, although initially not as members of the League. 

The second volume ran regularly for 29 issues from July 2018 to February 2021. The team would continue to appear as a back-up feature in the mainline Justice League series from issue #59 in May 2021 to issue #71 in March 2022 with guest appearances throughout issues #72 to 74.

Fictional overview

Members

Volume 1 
Early in the run, Peter Milligan stated that he was, "ruling no-one out" for future appearances, amid speculation that both the Ragman and the Spectre may feature in future comics. However, writer Jeff Lemire did not include either during the series, having added Black Orchid and Frankenstein, among others, to the team.

All members joined in issue #1 unless otherwise noted.

 Madame Xanadu – A mystic and fortune teller. Originally featured in Doorway to Nightmare. She was also featured in One Year Later and Flashpoint. She has previously dealt with John Constantine in the plot of Neil Gaiman's Books of Magic miniseries, where their relationship is fraught, as he has deceived her in the past. She brought the team together. She was captured as part of Project Thaumaton for the Crime Syndicate.
 John Constantine – A working class Liverpudlian magician. Originally from Swamp Thing and protagonist of long-running Vertigo title Hellblazer. John became the leader of the group in key issue #9. Ousted as team leader in issue #30, and replaced by Zatanna.
 Zatanna – A stage magician. First appeared in Hawkman #4 (November 1964), many other appearances, in 2010 had a solo series, was part of the Secret Seven during Flashpoint. She has previously been romantically involved with John Constantine. After assisting the Justice League during the "Throne of Atlantis" story line, she sides with the JL again in issue #22 for "Trinity War". She left Justice League Dark after issue #18. She was captured as part of Project Thaumaton for the Crime Syndicate. She became the leader of the team in issue #30.
 Deadman – The ghost of an assassinated acrobat who can possess the bodies of the living. Constantine found him soon after he was lost after the Crime Syndicate appeared, bound to the Sea King.
 Shade, the Changing Man – A hero with the power to warp reality. Originally featured in his own title, by Steve Ditko, and was later 'rebooted' in Peter Milligan's run on the series in the late 1980s and early 1990s. He was featured in a crossover event in Hellblazer in 2010, also written by Peter Milligan, although it is unclear if this will affect events in this title. He was also a member of the Secret Seven during the Flashpoint storyline. He is tasked with bringing the team together at the behest of Madame Xanadu. Left the team in issue #8. after losing control of the M-Vest.
 Mindwarp – An original character created by Peter Milligan for Flashpoint. In the event, he was a member of the Secret Seven. Jay Young is a man who possesses the powers of telepathy and astral projection. He may be aware of the Fourth Wall as evidenced by his reading Peter Milligan's Secret Seven miniseries and the Flashpoint title Deadman and the Flying Graysons. Introduced in issue #3 and left in issue #5. He is killed in Trinity of Sin: The Phantom Stranger #15 by Felix Faust and Nick Necro during testing of Project Thaumaton.
 Andrew Bennett – A centuries-old vampire from the title I... Vampire. Becomes a member of Justice League Dark as a favor to Constantine and is forcibly induced permanently by him. Left the team in issue #14, rejoined in issue #35.
 Black Orchid – A new shapeshifting version of Black Orchid. Revealed to be Alba Garcia, an A.R.G.U.S. agent who worked under Col. Steve Trevor. Joined in issue #9. She was captured as part of Project Thaumaton for the Crime Syndicate. Left the team in issue #30.
 Doctor Mist – The A.R.G.U.S. supernatural expert and consultant, he is tasked alongside Black Orchid to keep watch on Constantine. He is later revealed to be a spy working for Felix Faust. He tries to redeem himself by opening a portal to another dimension to save Tim Hunter and Zatanna. Joined in issue #9 and left the team after it was revealed he was working for Faust in issue #11.
 Frankenstein – An erudite creature created by Viktor Frankenstein, Frankenstein first assists the team in Justice League Dark Annual #1. He chooses to stay with the team in issue #14, out of a sense of responsibility towards Zatanna and Tim Hunter. He was captured as part of Project Thaumaton for the Crime Syndicate. Left the team in issue #30.
 Princess Amaya of House Amethyst – A fantasy princess from the world of Nilaa, and the main character of the Sword of Sorcery series. She is summoned to Earth in an effort to reconnect Tim Hunter with magic in Justice League Dark Annual #1. Last seen with the team in issue #14. Afterwards, she returned to Nilaa.
 Timothy Hunter – First introduced in issue #11, Timothy is a boy destined to wield and open the Books of Magic. He gave up his magic to save his father, but it was brought back when he shook Amethyst's hand. Timothy decides to stays in the alternate dimension as a wizard-king with his father at the end of issue #18.
 Swamp Thing – First joined the team in the "Horror City" story line, issues #19–21, and continues to aid them in their fight against Blight and subsequent threats for the remainder of the run.
 Nightmare Nurse – Joined to help fight Blight during "Forever Evil". A mysterious woman capable of healing even the most grievous mystical or supernatural wounds. Tried to clone the Swamp Thing to help Justice League Dark but the clone died, leaving the real Swamp Thing in its place. Her name may be Asa.
 The Phantom Stranger – One of the Trinity of Sin, joined to help fight Blight during "Forever Evil".
 Pandora – One of the Trinity of Sin, joined to help fight Blight during "Forever Evil". She unleashed the Seven Sins on Earth and has been fighting them for thousands of years. Her Box was a gateway that let the Crime Syndicate come from Earth-3. She is the mysterious figure who appeared at the end of Flashpoint when then the DC, Vertigo, and Wildstorm universes merged into one. She later appeared throughout the DC Universe, seemingly observing all the characters. Left the team in issue #29.
 Zauriel – An angel who is a guardian of Heaven.  He joined to help fight Blight during "Forever Evil".

Volume 2/back-up feature in Justice League (vol. 4) 
A different line-up was announced for DC Rebirth and Infinite Frontier:

Villains

Other versions

Futures End 
From a possible future; the roster consists of Zatanna, Etrigan the Demon, Cassandra Craft, the Black Orchid, the Nightmare Nurse, Madame Xanadu, Frankenstein, John Constantine, Amethyst, Blue Devil, Deadman, and Andrew Bennett.

DC Comics Bombshells 
Several former Suicide Squad members formed a new team. This roster consists of Zatanna, John Constantine, Raven, the Enchantress, Killer Croc, and the Ravager.

Flashpoint timeline 
Prior to Justice League Dark from The New 52, there was a similar version of the team called the Secret Seven in the Flashpoint timeline. The team consists of Shade, the Changing Man; Abra Kadabra, Amethyst, the Enchantress, Mindwarp, Raven, Zatanna, the Black Orchid, Klarion the Witch Boy, Miss X, Simon Magus, Stiletto, and Trigon.

Sorcerer Kings 
A story line in Superman/Batman shows a possible future version of the Justice League that consists of some supernatural members. The team includes a future Batman, the Scream Queen, Traci 13, Klarion the Witch Boy and Teekel; Stanley and His Monster; Aquaman, and Etrigan the Demon.

Earth 13 
Introduced in The Multiversity, a Justice League team from Earth 13 known as the League of Shadows (no relation to the League of Assassins offshoot) is similar to Justice League Dark. The team consists of Etrigan the Demon, Annataz, Deadman, the Enchantress, Fate, the Hellblazer, the Ragman, the Swamp-Man, and the Witchboy.

Countdown to Adventure 
On Earth-33, the League of Shamans is a similar team to Justice League Dark. The team consists of Bat-Mage, Super-Mage, Green Lantern, the Black Bird, Terra, Lady Flash, the Shade, and Kara Zor-El.

Future State 
From a possible future; the team consists of John Constantine, Zatanna, Madame Xanadu, Doctor Fate (Khalid Nassour), and Detective Chimp, the latter becoming the new host to Etrigan the Demon. They all work together to fight Merlin.

Collected editions
The series has been collected into the following trade paperbacks:

Volume 1 (The New 52 series)

Volume 2 (DC Universe series)

In other media

Television
 Members of the team were scheduled to appear in an episode of Constantine, but that series was cancelled before those episodes were produced.
 Before the cancellation of the 2019 Swamp Thing series, there were plans to introduce Justice League Dark and create a spin-off series based on that team.
 In January 2020, Warner Media and Bad Robot were working to create a Justice League Dark universe in film and television. In April 2020, a television series centered on the Justice League Dark characters was moving forward for HBO Max, with J. J. Abrams and Ben Stephenson serving as executive producers. It was no longer moving forward by February 2023.

Film

Animated

An animated Justice League Dark film was first announced in June 2016, as the next film in the DC Universe Animated Original Movies series. During the 2016 San Diego Comic-Con International, both John Constantine and the Swamp Thing were confirmed to appear. Batman, Zatanna, Deadman, Etrigan the Demon, and the Black Orchid would also appear as members of the team. Initially given a release window of Fall 2016, a sneak peek, with interviews by some of the creators, was provided as a bonus feature for the DVD and Blu-ray release of Batman: The Killing Joke. The film was digitally released on January 24, 2017, then on DVD and Blu-ray on February 7, 2017. In the film, Batman and Constantine recruit Zatanna, Boston Brand / Deadman, Jason Blood / Etrigan the Demon, and Alec Holland / the Swamp Thing to fight against a supernatural threat later revealed to be conducted by Doctor Destiny.

At the 2019 San Diego Comic Con, a sequel titled Justice League Dark: Apokolips War was announced and has been released in 2020. In the film, the remaining heroes and villains of Earth following Darkseid's successful conquest of Earth team up to finally end Darkseid's war.

Live action
Rumors in November 2012 suggested that Guillermo del Toro was working on a Justice League Dark film titled Heaven Sent. It would feature Deadman, the Spectre, the Swamp Thing, John Constantine, the Phantom Stranger, Zatanna, Zatara, Sargon the Sorcerer, and Etrigan the Demon. Del Toro later confirmed in January 2013 that he was working on such a film, with the working title, Dark Universe, and was hiring a screenwriter. Del Toro revealed the Swamp Thing, Constantine, the Spectre, Deadman, Zatanna and Zatara were characters in the story.

In March 2013, del Toro gave an update on the film at WonderCon 2013, while talking about his film Pacific Rim. He revealed that the story bible was complete and he hoped to start the screenplay soon. Production would begin after his next project, Crimson Peak. The film's story would center around John Constantine recruiting the Swamp Thing, Etrigan the Demon, Deadman, the Spectre, and Zatanna. The film would not be an origin story, with each character already established and elements of their backstory coming into play throughout the film. Del Toro also revealed that the Floronic Man would be in the film. In May 2013, del Toro revealed that his script featured Constantine, the Swamp Thing, Madame Xanadu, Deadman and Zatanna as the team, with others "in the mix". He also revealed that he was still waiting for the go-ahead from Warner Bros. Pictures. Del Toro revealed in July 2013 that he hoped that the DC Extended Universe, which started with Man of Steel, would become as cohesive as the Marvel Cinematic Universe, and he added that if there was any correlation to that universe and this film, he would honor it.

In October 2013, del Toro stated he felt his film would be able to coexist with the television series Constantine and reiterated that the film was still active and in the writing process. In July 2014, del Toro once again stated he was working on the film, and stated it would be independent from the universe established with Man of Steel, saying, "DC and Warners have been very clear that they are trying to keep [this film and Sandman] separate so when the time comes they can unite them, once they know they’re quantifiable." Del Toro also added that his Constantine would not adhere to the continuity established in the television series, but he would consider incorporating elements from it, and even think about casting the same actor (Matt Ryan). In November 2014, del Toro confirmed that the script was complete and handed it in to Warner Bros. to be reviewed. In December 2014, he hinted that the film would be part of the DC Extended Universe.

In April 2015, del Toro said the script revision has been handed in and if there was availability in his schedule, he would direct it; if not, "somebody else will do it... [The film] needs to fall into the plan of the shared universe." In June 2015, the film was confirmed to still be in development at Warner Bros., with some of their other Vertigo Comics film adaptions moving to New Line Cinema. The Hollywood Reporter stated that del Toro was no longer attached to the project. In July 2016, Swamp Thing test footage was released directed by Joseph Kahn. In August 2016, it was announced that Doug Liman would direct the film with del Toro and Scott Rudin producing and Michael Gilio writing, with the film being titled Dark Universe. By May 2017, Liman left the film to focus on directing Chaos Walking. At the San Diego Comic-Con in July 2017, the film's title was announced to be Justice League Dark. In January 2020, Deadline reported that Warner Media and Bad Robot are working to create a Justice League Dark universe in film and TV.

Video games
 Justice League Dark appears in Raiden's ending for Injustice 2, consisting of Raiden, the Swamp Thing, Zatanna, John Constantine, Etrigan the Demon, and Deadman.
 Justice League Dark appears in a self-titled DLC pack for Lego DC Super-Villains, consisting of John Constantine, Zatanna, Etrigan the Demon, Deadman, the Swamp Thing, and the Spectre. Additionally, the Enchantress and Frankenstein are stated to be members as well.

See also

 Justice League of Apostles
 Sentinels of Magic
 Shadowpact
 The Trenchcoat Brigade
Injustice League Dark

References

External links
DC page: JLD2011, JLD2018
Justice League Dark at Comic Vine
DC Comics The New 52 – Justice League Dark, DC Comics.com

Justice League
Justice League titles
Comics by J. M. DeMatteis
Comics by Peter Milligan
2011 comics debuts
2018 comics debuts
DC Comics adapted into films